The 2022 Pac-12 Conference football season is the 44th season of Pac-12 football taking place during the 2022 NCAA Division I FBS football season. The season begins on September 1, 2022, and ends with the 2022 Pac-12 Championship Game on December 2, 2022, at Allegiant Stadium in Paradise, Nevada.

The Pac-12 is a Power Five Conference under the College Football Playoff format along with the Atlantic Coast Conference, the Big 12 Conference, Big Ten Conference, and the Southeastern Conference.

The 2022 season is the first since the conference expanded to 12 teams in 2011 in which Pac-12 teams are not split into divisions. On May 18, 2022, the NCAA Division I Council approved a rule change that gave conferences complete freedom in choosing the participants in their championship games. On that same day, the Pac-12 announced that effective immediately, the championship game would feature the top two teams in the conference standings. The 2022 schedule, which was based on the conference's former North–South divisional model, did not change; the Pac-12 stated that it was reviewing multiple scheduling models for future seasons.

The Utah Utes’ participation in the 2022 Pac-12 Championship was decided by strength-of-schedule tiebreaker. Oregon, Utah, and Washington finished the regular season in a 3-way tie for 2nd place. Each team has a tied common opponent record and there was a tie for the next highest seed common opponent.

Previous season
The Utah Utes defeated Oregon Ducks 38–10 in the Pac-12 Football Championship Game.

Six teams participated in bowl games, finishing with a record of 0–5 & one no contest. Oregon State lost to Utah State in the Jimmy Kimmel LA Bowl, 13–24. UCLA & NC State did not play the Holiday Bowl due to Covid issues with UCLA, the game was ruled a no contest. Oregon lost to Oklahoma in the Alamo Bowl, 32–47. Arizona State lost to Wisconsin in the Las Vegas Bowl, 13–20. Washington State lost to Central Michigan in the Sun Bowl, 21–24. Utah lost to Ohio State in the Rose Bowl, 45–48.

Preseason
2022 Pac-12 Spring Football and number of signees on signing day:

Arizona – 22
Arizona State – 17
California – 21
Colorado – 20
Oregon – 23
Oregon State – 16
Stanford – 21
UCLA – 12
USC – 26
Utah – 18
Washington – 10
Washington State – 25

Recruiting classes

Pac-12 Media Days
The Pac-12 conducted its 2022 Pac-12 media day on July 29, 2022, at the Novo Theater, LA Live (Pac-12 Network).

The teams and representatives in respective order were as follows:

 Pac-12 Commissioner – George Kliavkoff
 Arizona – Jedd Fisch (HC), Jacob Cowing (WR) & Christian Young (DB)
 Arizona State – Herm Edwards (HC), Ladarius Henderson (OL) & Kyle Soelle (LB)
 California – Justin Wilcox (HC), Matthew Cindric (OL) & Daniel Scott (S)
 Colorado – Karl Dorrell (HC), Casey Roddrick (OG) & Robert Barnes (ILB)
 Oregon – Dan Lanning  (HC), Alex Forsyth (OL) & D. J. Johnson (OLB)
 Oregon State – Jonathan Smith (HC), Luke Musgrave (TE) & Alex Austin (DB)
 Stanford – David Shaw (HC), Tanner McKee (QB) & Kyu Blu Kelly (CB)
 UCLA – Chip Kelly (HC), Jon Gaines II (OL) & Stephan Blaylock (DB)
 USC – Lincoln Riley (HC), Caleb Williams (QB) & Shane Lee (LB)
 Utah – Kyle Whittingham (HC), Cameron Rising (QB) & Clark Phillips III (CB)
 Washington – Kalen DeBoer (HC), Jaxson Kirkland (OL) & Alex Cook (DB)
 Washington State – Jake Dickert (HC), Cameron Ward (QB) & Ron Stone Jr. (DL)

Preseason Media polls
The preseason polls was released on July 28, 2022. Since 1992, the credentialed media has gotten the preseason champion correct just five times. Only nine times has the preseason pick even made it to the Pac-12 title game. Below are the results of the media poll with total points received next to each school and first-place votes in parentheses.

Preseason awards

All−American Teams

Individual awards

Preseason All Pac-12
Sources:

First Team

Second Team

All Pac–12 Honorable Mention (received votes from four or more members of the media): 
Arizona: Christian Roland-Wallace (DB)
Arizona State: Xazavian Valladay (RB), Kyle Soelle (LB)
California: Damien Moore (RB), Matthew Cindric (OL), Ben Coleman (OL), Oluwafemi Oladejo (LB), Lu-Magia Hearns III (DB), Dario Longhetto (PK), Nick Alftin (AP/ST)
Colorado: Frank Filip (OL), Terrance Lang (DL), Jalen Sami (DL), Isaiah Lewis (DB), Nikko Reed (RS)
Oregon: Ryan Walk (OL), Popo Aumavae (DL), Bennett Williams (DB), Jamal Hill (DB), Seven McGee (AP/ST)
Oregon State: Jake Levengood (OL), Everett Hayes (PK)
Stanford: Tanner McKee (QB),  E. J. Smith (RB), Elijah Higgins (WR), Branson Bragg (OL), Walter Rouse (OL), Levani Damuni (LB), Ryan Sanborn (P), Casey Filkins (RS)
UCLA: Dorian Thompson-Robinson (QB), Jon Gaines II (OL), Stephan Blaylock (DB)
USC: Gary Bryant Jr. (WR), Nick Figueroa (DL), Solomon Byrd (DL), Korey Foreman (LB), Xavion Alford (DB), Brenden Rice (RS)
Utah: Devaughn Vele (WR), Dalton Kincaid (TE), Mohamoud Diabate (LB), JaTravis Broughton (DB)
Washington: Jalen McMillan (WR), Edefuan Olofoshio (LB), Carson Bruener (LB), Giles Jackson (AP/ST)
Washington State: De'Zhaun Stribling (WR), Brennan Jackson (DL), Daiyan Henley (LB), Armani Marsh (DB), Derrick Langford (DB), Nick Haberer (P)

Head coaches

Coaching changes
There was three coaching changes before the 2022 season.  Washington State removed the interim head coaching tag on November 27, 2021, making Jake Dickert the 34th coach in team history.  On November 29, 2021 Lincoln Riley was hired as the 30th head coach in USC history.  The Washington Huskies hired Kalen DeBoer on November 30, 2021, making DeBoer the 30th coach in team history.  The Oregon Ducks hired Dan Lanning on December 12, 2021, making Lanning the 32nd coach in team history.

On September 18 following their loss to Eastern Michigan, Arizona State and coach Herm Edwards agreed to part ways.  Edwards ended his career at Arizona State with an overall record of 26–20 & a record of 17–14 in conference play.

On October 2 following their loss to Arizona, Colorado fired coach Karl Dorrell.  Dorrell ended his career at Colorado with an overall record of 8–15 & a record of 6–9 in conference play.

On November 27, just over an hour after losing to BYU to complete their second consecutive 3–9 season, Stanford coach David Shaw resigned, effective immediately, after 12 seasons with an overall record of 96–54 and a record of 65–40 in conference play.

Coaches
Note: All stats current through the completion of the 2021 season

Note:

 Jake Dickert served as interim head coach at Washington State in 2021 and coached for five games, going 3–3.
 Herm Edward coached the first three games as head coach at Arizona State State in 2022, going 1–2.  Shaun Aguano took over the fourth game of the season.
 Karl Dorrell coached the first five games as head coach at Colorado in 2022, going 0–5.  Mike Sanford Jr. took over the sixth game of the season.

Rankings

Schedules

All times Pacific time.  Pac-12 teams in bold.

† denotes Homecoming game

Rankings reflect those of the AP poll for weeks 1 through 9.  Rankings from Week 10 until the end of the Season reflect those of the College Football Playoff Rankings.

Regular season
The regular season is scheduled to begin on September 1, 2022, and end on December 2, 2022.

Week 1

Week 2

Week 3

Week 4

Week 5

Week 6

Week 7

Week 8

Week 9

Week 10

Week 11

Week 12

Week 13

Pac-12 Championship Game

The Pac-12 Championship Game, the conference's eleventh championship game, will be played on December 2, 2022, at the home stadium of the Las Vegas Raiders at Allegiant Stadium in Paradise, Nevada.  Starting in 2022, the two teams with the highest conference winning percentage will face off in the championship game.  After a 48-45 victory over their home town rival,  USC clinched the first spot in the conference title game.

Postseason

Bowl games

For the 2020–2025 bowl cycle, The Pac-12 will have annually seven appearances in the following bowls: Rose Bowl (unless they are selected for playoffs filled by a Pac-12 team if champion is in the playoffs), LA Bowl, Las Vegas Bowl, Alamo Bowl, Holiday Bowl, and Sun Bowl. The Pac-12 teams will go to a New Year's Six bowl if a team finishes higher than the champions of Power Five conferences in the final College Football Playoff rankings. The Pac-12 champion are also eligible for the College Football Playoff if they're among the top four teams in the final CFP ranking.

 

Rankings are from CFB Rankings.  All times Pacific Time Zone. Pac-12 teams shown in bold.

Selection of teams
Bowl eligible (7): Oregon, Oregon State, UCLA, USC, Utah, Washington, & Washington State
Bowl-ineligible (5): Arizona, Arizona State, California, Colorado, & Stanford

Head to head matchups

This table summarizes the head-to-head results between teams in conference play.

Updated with the results of all games through December 2022.

Pac-12 records vs Other Conferences
2022–2023 records against non-conference foes:

Regular Season

Post Season

Pac-12 vs Power Five matchups
The following games include Pac-12 teams competing against Power Five conference teams from the ACC, Big Ten, Big 12,  and SEC, plus independents Notre Dame (an ACC member in non-football sports) and BYU (a future Big 12 member). All rankings are from the AP Poll at the time of the game.

Pac-12 vs Group of Five matchups
The following games include Pac-12 teams competing against teams from the American, C-USA, MAC, Mountain West or Sun Belt.

Pac-12 vs FBS independents matchups
The following games include Pac-12 teams competing against FBS Independents, which includes Army, Liberty, New Mexico State, UConn or UMass.

Pac-12 vs FCS matchups
The Football Championship Subdivision comprises 13 conferences and two independent programs.

Note:† Denotes Neutral Site Game

Awards and honors

Player of the week honors

Totals per school

Pac-12 individual awards
The following individuals received postseason honors as voted by the Pac-12 Conference football coaches at the end of the season

All-conference teams
The following players earned All-Pac-12 honors. Any teams showing (_) following their name are indicating the number of All-Pac-12 Conference Honors awarded to that university for 1st team and 2nd team respectively.

Source:

First Team

Second Team

Notes:
 RS = Return Specialist
 AP/ST = All-Purpose/Special Teams Player (not a kicker or returner)
 † Two-time first team selection;
 ‡ Three-time first team selection

Honorable mentions
ARIZONA: WR Jacob Cowing, Jr.;  QB Jayden de Laura, So.;  K Tyler Loop, So.;  OL Jordan Morgan, Jr.;  OL Jonah Savaiinaea, Fr.; RB Michael Wiley Jr.
ARIZONA STATE: WR Elijhah Badger, R-So.;  DB Jordan Clark, R-Jr.;  TE Jalin Conyers, R-So.;  RS Daniyel Ngata, R-So.;  LB Merlin Robertson, 5th;  DL Nesta Jade Slivera, Gr;  LB Kyle Soelle, R-5th;  DB Ro Torrance, R-So.
CALIFORNIA: DB Jeremiah Earby, Fr.;  WR/RS Jeremiah Hunter, Jr.;  RB Jaydn Ott, Fr.;  DB Daniel Scott, R-Sr.;  WR J. Michael Sturdivant, R-Fr.;  DB Craig Woodson, R-Jr.
COLORADO: ILB Josh Chandler-Semedo, Gr.;  DB/RS Nikko Reed, So.;  OL Casey Roddick, Jr.;  TE Brady Russell, Sr.;  DL Jalen Sami, Jr.
OREGON: OL Malaesala Aumavae-Laulu, Sr.;  WR Chase Cota, Sr.;  TE Terrance Ferguson, So.;  RB Bucky Irving, So.;  OLB D. J. Johnson, Sr.;  K Camden Lewis, Jr.;  QB Bo Nix, Sr.;  OL Ryan Walk, Sr.;  DB Bennett Williams, Sr. 
OREGON STATE: DB Alex Austin, R-So.;  DB Ryan Cooper Jr., Jr.;   LB Kyrei Fisher-Morris, R-Sr.;  WR Tre'Shaun Harrison, Sr.;  OL Brandon Kipper, R-Sr.;  OL Jake Levengood, R-Jr.;  P Luke Loecher, R-Sr.;  DL Sione Lolohea, So.;  DB Kitan Oladapo, R-Jr.;  DL James Rawls, R-Jr.
STANFORD: LB Levani Dumani, Sr.; DL Stephen Herron, Sr.;  WR Elijah Higgins, Sr.;  LB Ricky Miezan, 5th, OL Drake Nugent, Sr.;  OL Walter Rouse, Sr.;  P Ryan Sanborn, Sr.;  AP/ST Brycen Tremayne, 5th;  WR Michael Wilson, 5th
UCLA: DB Stephan Blaylock, R-Sr.;  WR Jake Bobo, R-Sr.;   OL Jon Gaines II, Sr.;  QB Dorian Thompson-Robinson, R-Sr.
USC: OL Justin Dedich, R-Sr.;  OL Jonah Monheim, R-So.;  LB Shane Lee, Sr.;  WR Tahj Washington, R-Jr.;  DB Max Williams, R-Jr.
UTAH: OL Keaton Bills, So.;  S Cole Bishop, So.;  DL Jonah Elliss, So.;  DB R.J. Hubert, Sr.;  QB Cameron Rising, Jr.;  WR Devaughn Vele, So.
WASHINGTON: OL Henry Bainivalu, Sr.;  LB Cam Bright, Sr.;  OL Corey Luciano, Sr.;  WR Jalen McMillan, So.;  RB Wayne Taulapapa, Gr.;  DL Zion Tupuola-Fetui, Jr.;  LB Alphonzo Tuputala, So.;  DB Asa Turner, Jr.
WASHINGTON STATE: RS Robert Ferrel, 5th;  P Nick Haberer, So.;  OL Jarrett Kingston, R-Jr.;  DB Armani Marsh, R-Sr.;  DB Chau Smith-Wade, So.;  QB Cameron Ward, So.;  RB Nakia Watson, R-Jr.

All-Americans

Currently, the NCAA compiles consensus all-America teams in the sports of Division I-FBS football and Division I men's basketball using a point system computed from All-America teams named by coaches associations or media sources.  The system consists of three points for a first-team honor, two points for second-team honor, and one point for third-team honor.  Honorable mention and fourth team or lower recognitions are not accorded any points.  College Football All-American consensus teams are compiled by position and the player accumulating the most points at each position is named first team consensus all-American.  Currently, the NCAA recognizes All-Americans selected by the AP, AFCA, FWAA, TSN, and the WCFF to determine Consensus and Unanimous All-Americans. Any player named to the First Team by all five of the NCAA-recognized selectors is deemed a Unanimous All-American.

Fourth Team:
 Zach Charbonnet, RB, UCLA − Phil Steele
 Rome Odunze, WR, Washington − Phil Steele
 T.J. Bass, OL, Oregon − Phil Steele
 Christian Gonzalez, DB, Oregon − Phil Steele

Sources:
*American Football Coaches Association All-America Team
*AP All-America team
*The Athletic All-America Team
*CBS Sports All-America Team
*Phil Steele's 2022 Postseason All-American Team
*ESPN All-America Team
*FWAA All-America Team
*Sporting News All-America Team
*USA Today All-America Team
*Walter Camp All-America Team

National award winners
2022 College Football Award Winners

Home game attendance

Bold – At or Exceed capacity
†Season High 
‡Oregon State is renovating their stadium during the 2022 season reducing the capacity to 26,407.

References